"Deliver us from evil" is a line from the Lord's Prayer in the Bible.

Deliver Us from Evil may also refer to:

Books 
 Deliver Us from Evil (novel), a novel by David Baldacci
 Deliver Us from Evil: Defeating Terrorism, Despotism, and Liberalism, a 2004 book by Sean Hannity
 Deliver Us from Evil: The Story of Vietnam's Flight to Freedom, a 1956 book by US Navy physician and humanitarian Thomas Anthony Dooley III
 Deliver Us from Evil: Warlords and Peacekeepers in a World of Endless Conflict, a 2000 book by William Shawcross

Films 
 Deliver Us from Evil (1969 film), a Canadian drama film
 Deliver Us from Evil (1973 film), an American television crime drama film
 Deliver Us from Evil (2006 film), an American documentary film about pedophile priest Oliver O'Grady
 Deliver Us from Evil (2009 film), a Danish thriller film by Danish director Ole Bornedal
 Deliver Us from Evil (2014 film), an American supernatural horror film by Scott Derrickson
 Deliver Us from Evil (2020 film), a South Korean action film

Music 
 Deliver Us from Evil (Budgie album), a 1982 album by Budgie
 Deliver Us from Evil (Kryst the Conqueror album), a 1990 EP and an unreleased album by Kryst the Conqueror